Jan Ottosson (born 10 March 1960 in Högsäter, Dalsland) is a former Swedish cross-country skier. A national team skier, he also represented Åsarna IK during the 1980s and early 1990s. He won two gold medals in the 4 × 10 km relay at the Winter Olympics (1984 and 1988), providing some of the most iconic and impressive legs of Swedish Olympic history. Additionally, he finished sixth in the 50 km event at the 1988 Winter Olympics, sixth in the 15 km event at the 1991 Nordic skiing World Championships, won eight individual Swedish championships, and won ten Swedish championship gold medals in the relays. Ottosson in best known is for winning the Vasaloppet four times in (1989, 1991, 1992, 1994). After his active career with the Åsarnas squad, Ottosson now works as an official on the Bergs ski center.  Currently, Ottosson runs his own Vasaloppet training program, where the former champion helps others prepare for the race. Ottosson also owns a state-of-the-art ski grinding machine and a ski waxing business which the former champion uses to perfect patrons' skis for Vasaloppet race conditions.

Cross-country skiing results
All results are sourced from the International Ski Federation (FIS).

Olympic Games
 2 medals – (2 gold)

World Championships

World Cup

Season standings

Individual podiums
1 victory 
5 podiums

Team podiums
 6 victories 
 9 podiums 

Note:  Until the 1994 Winter Olympics, Olympic races were included in the World Cup scoring system.

References

External links
Factmonster information on cross country skiing Olympic champions 1924-2002, including Ottosson

Cross-country skiers at the 1984 Winter Olympics
Cross-country skiers at the 1988 Winter Olympics
Cross-country skiers at the 1992 Winter Olympics
Cross-country skiers at the 1994 Winter Olympics
Swedish male cross-country skiers
Vasaloppet winners
1960 births
Living people
Olympic medalists in cross-country skiing
Medalists at the 1984 Winter Olympics
Åsarna IK skiers
Medalists at the 1988 Winter Olympics
Olympic gold medalists for Sweden
Olympic cross-country skiers of Sweden